Henri Leconte was the defending champion but lost in the second round to Goran Ivanišević.

Andrei Chesnokov won in the final 6–4, 6–4 against Jérôme Potier.

Seeds
A champion seed is indicated in bold text while text in italics indicates the round in which that seed was eliminated.

  Kent Carlsson (first round)
  Henri Leconte (second round)
  Guillermo Pérez Roldán (quarterfinals)
  Ronald Agénor (second round)
  Alberto Mancini (quarterfinals)
  Andrei Chesnokov (champion)
  Horst Skoff (second round)
  Jordi Arrese (second round)

Draw

External links
 Main draw

Singles